Toowoomba City is an urban locality in the Toowoomba Region, Queensland, Australia. 
It is the central suburb of Toowoomba, containing its central business district.

Geography 
The suburb is roughly rectangular, bounded to the north by Bridge Street, to the east by Hume Street, to the south by James Street, and to the west by West Street.

Toowoomba railway station is in Russell Street. It serves the city of Toowoomba, and is the junction and terminus for the Main Line railway from Brisbane, the Western railway from Cunnamulla, and  Southern railway from Wallangarra on the Queensland-New South Wales border.

History 
Toowoomba North Boys State School and Toowoomba North Girls and Infants State School both opened in 1869. In 1937 the two schools were combined to form Toowoomba North State School.

In 1881, a Baptist Church opened in Toowoomba.

The Holy Name Primary School was opened on 23 January 1905 by the Sisters of Mercy who were already operating the school at St Patrick's Church (the church is now St Patrick's Cathedral and the St Patrick's school is now known as St Saviours School & College). The Holy Name school was burned down on 4 August 1919, so the school operated from the Mr and Mrs Hannant on the corner of West and Norwood Streets, until the school was rebuilt. Archbishop James Duhig laid the foundation school for the new church and school on 23 November 1919 and officially opened it on 23 January 1921.

In the  Toowoomba City had a population of 2,281 people.

The Toowoomba City library opened in 2016. The Toowoomba local history library opened in 1999 with a major refurbishment in 2016.

Heritage listings 

There are many heritage-listed sites in Toowoomba City, including:

 9 Boulton Street: Tawa
 1 Clifford Street: Harris House
 Herries Street: St Luke's Anglican Church
 149 Herries Street: Soldiers Memorial Hall

 152 Herries Street: St Luke's Church Hall

 136 Margaret Street: Toowoomba Post Office
 159-167 Margaret Street: Strand Theatre
 245-253 Margaret Street: Exchange Building

 3 Mill Street: Carlton House
 145 Mort Street: St James Church
 46 Neil Street: Toowoomba Court House
 50-52 Neil Street: Toowoomba Police Station Complex
 54 Neil Street: Wesley Uniting Church
 56 & 56A Neil Street: Empire Theatre
 Russell Street: Men's Toilet

 Russell Street: Toowoomba railway station

 2 Russell Street,: Toowoomba Permanent Building Society
 19A Russell Stree: Toowoomba Trades Hall
 112 Russell Street: St James Parish Hall
 120 Russell Street: Clifford House
 126 Russell Street: Kensington
 127 Russell Street: Wislet

 135 Russell Street: Vacy Hall

 251-267 Ruthven Street: Toowoomba Foundry
 269-291 Ruthven Street: Defiance Flour Mill
 381-391 Ruthven Street: Pigott's Building
 386-388 Ruthven Street: Karingal Chambers
 451-455 Ruthven Street: Alexandra Building
 456 Ruthven Street: White Horse Hotel
 541 Ruthven Street: Toowoomba City Hall
 corner of West Street, Hill Street and Herries Street: Laurel Bank Park

Shopping
Toowoomba City contains two significant shopping centres, presently under the same ownership. Both are currently owned by QIC, following its acquisition of Garden Town in January 2009 from Aspen Group, they are now being redeveloped to join together via a two level galleria to form one shopping centre.

Two smaller centres, the Hooper Centre and a homeware centre, and street shopping along Ruthven Street round out the city centre's retail offerings.
There is also a small shopping area on the corner of Ramsay and South streets called Southtown. It contains several eating places, supermarket, newsagent and Post Office.

Transport

Toowoomba City is situated at the intersection of the New England Highway and Warrego Highway, and contains Toowoomba railway station (the terminus of the Westlander service) and the city's bus interchange on Neil Street, from which various buses depart for the suburbs. Toowoomba also has a taxi facility available.

Education 
Toowoomba North State School is a government primary (P-6) school for boys and girls located on the south-west corner of Mort and Taylor Streets. In 2015, the school had an enrolment of 157 students with 12 teachers (11 full-time equivalent).

Holy Name Primary School is a Catholic primary (P-6) school for boys and girls operated in the Mercy tradition at 188 Bridge Street. In 2016, the school had an enrolment of 154 students with 12 teachers (10.3 full-time equivalent) and 8 non-teaching staff (5 full-time equivalent).

Libraries 
The Tooowoomba City library is located at 155 Herries Street. The library is open seven days a week.

The local history library is located at 155 Herries Street. The local history library has a comprehensive archival collection that is of local, state and national significance, including the Robinson Collection named after Toowoomba's first female mayor Nellie E. Robinson. This comprehensive collection contains records from local personalities, businesses and community organizations.

Both libraries are operated by the Toowoomba Regional Council.

Community groups 
The Toowoomba branch of the Queensland Country Women's Association meets at 263 Margaret Street and the Toowoomba City Business Women’s branch meets at 161 Margaret Street.

Heritage listings 
Toowoomba City has a number of heritage-listed sites, including:

 9 Boulton Street: Tawa
 Herries Street: St Luke's Anglican Church
 149 Herries Street: Soldiers Memorial Hall
 152 Herries Street: St Luke's Church Hall
 136 Margaret Street: Toowoomba Post Office
 159-167 Margaret Street: Strand Theatre
 245-253 Margaret Street: Exchange Building
 3 Mill Street: Carlton House
 139 Mort Street: Toowoomba North State School
 145 Mort Street: St James Church
 46 Neil Street: Toowoomba Court House
 50-52 Neil Street: Toowoomba Police Station Complex
 54 Neil Street: Wesley Uniting Church
 56 & 56A Neil Street: Empire Theatre
 Russell Street: Men's Toilet
 Russell Street: Toowoomba railway station
 2 Russell Street: Toowoomba Permanent Building Society
 19A Russell Street: Toowoomba Trades Hall
 112 Russell Street: St James Parish Hall
 120 Russell Street: Clifford House
 126 Russell Street: Kensington
 127 Russell Street: Wislet
 135 Russell Street: Vacy Hall
 251-267 Ruthven Street: Toowoomba Foundry
 269-291 Ruthven Street: Defiance Flour Mill
 381-391 Ruthven Street: Pigott's Building
 386-388 Ruthven Street: Karingal Chambers
 451-455 Ruthven Street: Alexandra Building
 456 Ruthven Street: White Horse Hotel
 541 Ruthven Street: Toowoomba City Hall

References

 
Suburbs of Toowoomba
Localities in Queensland
Central business districts in Australia